Member of the Resistance in France during World War II, he was sentenced to death, but just deported.

French war correspondent, Jean-Marie de Prémonville de Maisonthou covered the Korean War for the Agence France-Presse before being killed by machinegun fire while riding with a patrol on 12 February 1951 during the battle of Chipyong-ni.

He had initially been sent to replace AFP correspondent Maximilien Philomenko who had been killed earlier.

He co-authored the book Return to Korea: Tales of Four War Correspondents on the Korean Front, published by Rene Juilliard in 1951, along with Serge Bromberger, Philippe Baudy and  Henri de Turenne (writer).

References

1951 deaths
French journalists
French war correspondents
Journalists killed while covering the Korean War
Year of birth missing
French male writers